The Rock Springs massacre, also known as the Rock Springs riot, occurred on September 2, 1885, in the present-day United States city of Rock Springs in Sweetwater County, Wyoming. The riot, and resulting massacre of immigrant Chinese miners by white immigrant miners, was the result of racial prejudice toward the Chinese miners, who were perceived to be taking jobs from the white miners. The Union Pacific Coal Department found it economically beneficial to give preference in hiring to Chinese miners, who were willing to work for lower wages than their white counterparts, angering the white miners. When the rioting ended, at least 28 Chinese miners were dead and 15 were injured. Rioters burned 78 Chinese homes, resulting in approximately $150,000 in property damage (equal to $ in 2020 terms).

Tension between whites and Chinese immigrants in the late 19th-century American West was particularly high, especially in the decade preceding the violence. The massacre in Rock Springs was one among several instances of violence culminating from years of anti-Chinese sentiment in the United States. The Chinese Exclusion Act in 1882 suspended Chinese immigration for ten years, but not before thousands of immigrants came to the American West. Most Chinese immigrants to Wyoming Territory took jobs with the railroad at first, but many ended up employed in coal mines owned by the Union Pacific Railroad. As Chinese immigration increased, so did anti-Chinese sentiment on the part of whites. The Knights of Labor, one of the foremost voices against Chinese immigrant labor, formed a chapter in Rock Springs in 1883, and most rioters were members of that organization. However, no direct connection was ever established linking the riot to the national Knights of Labor organization.

In the immediate aftermath of the riot, United States Army troops were deployed in Rock Springs. They escorted the surviving Chinese miners, most of whom had fled to Evanston, Wyoming, back to Rock Springs a week after the riot. Reaction came swiftly from the era's publications. In Rock Springs, the local newspaper endorsed the outcome of the riot, while in other Wyoming newspapers, support for the riot was limited to sympathy for the causes of the white miners. The massacre in Rock Springs touched off a wave of anti-Chinese violence, especially in the Puget Sound area of Washington Territory.

Background

Chinese immigration to the United States at that time was neither uniform nor widespread. J. R. Tucker, writing for The North American Review in 1884, stated that the vast majority of the nearly 100,000 Chinese immigrants resided within the American West: California, Nevada, Oregon, and the Washington Territory. The U.S. Minister to China, George Seward, had asserted similar numbers in Scribner's Magazine five years earlier.

The first jobs Chinese laborers took in Wyoming were on the railroad, working for the Union Pacific company (UP) as maintenance-of-way workers. Chinese workers soon became an asset to Union Pacific and worked along UP lines and in UP coal mines from Laramie to Evanston. Most Chinese workers in Wyoming ended up working in Sweetwater County, but a large number settled in Carbon and Uinta counties. Most Chinese people in the area were men working in the mine. Racism against Chinese immigrants was widespread and largely uncontroversial at the time. Tucker, in the aforementioned 1884 article, referred to Asian immigrants as "...the Asiatic race, alien in blood, habits, and civilization". He also noted, "Chinese are the chief element in this Asiatic population."

In 1874–75, after labor unrest disrupted coal production, the Union Pacific Coal Department hired Chinese laborers to work in their coal mines throughout southern Wyoming. Even so, the Chinese population rose slowly at first; however, where there were Chinese immigrants, they were generally concentrated in one area. At Red Desert, a remote section camp in Sweetwater County, there were 20 inhabitants, of whom 12 were Chinese. All 12 were laborers who worked under an American foreman. To the east of Red Desert was another remote section camp, Washakie. An American section foreman lived there amongst 23 others, including 13 Chinese laborers and an Irish crew foreman. In the various section camps along the main line of the Union Pacific Railroad, Chinese workers far outnumbered any other nationality. Though the 79 Chinese in Sweetwater County in 1870 represented only 4% of the total population, they were, again, concentrated. In Rock Springs and Green River, the largest towns along the UP line, there were no Chinese residents reported in 1870.

Throughout the 1870s, the Chinese population in Sweetwater County and all of Wyoming steadily increased. During the decade, Wyoming's total population rose from 9,118 to 20,789. In the 1870 U.S. census, what the government today calls "Asian and Pacific Islanders" represented 143 members of the population of Wyoming. The increase during the 1870s was the largest percentage increase in the Asian population of Wyoming of any decade since; the increase represented a 539% jump in the Asian population. By 1880, most Chinese residents in Sweetwater County lived in Rock Springs. At that time, Wyoming was home to 914 "Asians"; that number fell significantly during the 1880s to 465.

Although most Chinese workers in 1880 were employed in the coal mines around Wyoming and Sweetwater County, the Chinese in Rock Springs worked mostly in occupations outside of mining. In addition to Chinese laborers and miners, a professional gambler, a priest, a cook, and a barber resided in the city. In Green River, Wyoming, there was a Chinese doctor. Chinese servants and waiters found work in Green River and in Fort Washakie. In Atlantic City, Miner's Delight, and Red Canyon, Wyoming, Chinese gold miners were employed. However, the majority of the 193 Chinese residing in Sweetwater County by 1880 worked in the coal mines or on the railroad.

Causes
The riot was the result of a combination of racial prejudice and general resentment against Union Pacific. In 1882, the Chinese Exclusion Act required that "... from and after the expiration of ninety days next after the passage of this act, and until the expiration of ten years next after the passage of this act, the coming of Chinese laborers to the United States be, and the same is hereby, suspended; and during such suspension it shall not be lawful for any Chinese laborer to come." In the years preceding the Rock Springs massacre, the importation of Chinese labor was seen as a "system worse than slavery". The white miners at Rock Springs, being mostly Cornish, Irish, Swedish, and Welsh immigrants, believed lower-paid Chinese laborers drove down their wages.

The Chinese at Rock Springs were aware of the animosity and rising racial tension with white miners, but had not taken any precautions, as no prior events indicated there would be any race riots. Underlying the outbreak of violence were racism and resentment of the policies of the Union Pacific Coal Department. Until 1875, the mines in Rock Springs were worked by whites; in that year, a strike occurred, and the strikers were replaced with Chinese strikebreakers less than two weeks after the strike began. The company resumed mining with 50 white miners and 150 Chinese miners in its employ. As more Chinese arrived in Rock Springs, bitterness from the white miners increased. At the time of the massacre, there were about 150 white miners and 331 Chinese miners in Rock Springs.

In the two years before the massacre, a "Whitemen's Town" was established in Rock Springs. By 1883, the Knights of Labor organized a chapter in Rock Springs. The Knights were one of the major groups which spearheaded opposition to Chinese labor during the 1880s; in 1882, the Knights had worked for the passage of the Chinese Exclusion Act. No evidence has been uncovered to prove that the national Knights of Labor organization was behind the massacre at Rock Springs. In August 1885, notices were posted from Evanston to Rock Springs, demanding the expulsion of Chinese immigrants, and on the evening of September 1, 1885, one day before the violence, white miners in Rock Springs held a meeting about the Chinese immigrants. It was rumored that threats were made that night against the Chinese, according to immigrants then residing there.

Massacre

Chronology

At 7:00 a.m. on September 2, 1885, ten white men, in ordinary garb and miner's uniforms, arrived at coal pit number six at the Rock Springs mine. They declared that the Chinese laborers had no right to work in a particularly desirable "room" in the mine; miners were paid by the ton, thus location was important to the miners. A fight broke out, and two Chinese workers at pit number six were badly beaten. One of the Chinese workers later died due to his injuries. The white miners, most of whom were members of the Knights of Labor, walked out of the mine.

After the work stoppage at pit number six, more white miners assembled near the town. They marched to Rock Springs by way of the railroad, carrying firearms. At about 10:00 a.m., the bell in the Knights of Labor meeting hall tolled, and the miners inside the building joined the already large group. There were white miners who opted to go to saloons instead of joining the gathering mob, but by 2:00 p.m., the saloons and grocers were persuaded by a Union Pacific official to close.

With the saloons and grocers closed, about 150 men, armed with Winchester rifles, moved toward Chinatown in Rock Springs. They moved in two groups and entered Chinatown by crossing separate bridges. The larger group entered by way of the railroad bridge and was divided into squads, a few of which remained standing on the opposite side of the bridge outside Chinatown. The smaller group entered by way of the town's plank bridge.

Squads from the larger group broke off and moved up the hill toward coal pit number three. One squad took up a position at the pit number three coal shed; another, at the pump house. A warning party was sent ahead of the squads into Chinatown. They warned the Chinese they had one hour to pack up and leave town. After only 30 minutes, the first gunshots were fired by the squad at the pump house, followed by a volley from those at the coal shed. Lor Sun Kit, a Chinese laborer, was shot and fell to the ground. As the group at coal pit number three rejoined them, the crowd pressed on toward Chinatown, some men firing their weapons as they went. The smaller group of white miners at the plank bridge divided itself into squads and surrounded Chinatown. One squad stayed at the plank bridge to cut off any Chinese escape.

As the white miners moved into Chinatown, the Chinese became aware of the riot and that Leo Dye Bah and Yip Ah Marn, residents from the west and east sides of Chinatown, had already been killed. As the news of the murders spread, the Chinese fled in fear and confusion. They ran in every direction: up the hill behind coal pit number three; others, along the base of the hill at coal pit number four; others still, from the eastern end of town, fled across Bitter Creek to the opposite hill; and more fled the western end of Chinatown across the base of the hill to the right of coal pit number five. The mob came from three directions by this time, from the east and west ends of town and from the wagon road. The Chinese immigrants present at the Rock Springs massacre presented their own grisly account of the mêlée to the Chinese consul in New York City: 

By 3:30 p.m. the massacre was well under way. A group of women in Rock Springs had gathered at the plank bridge, where they stood and cheered on the rampage. Two of the women reportedly fired shots at the Chinese. As the riot wore on into the night, the Chinese miners scattered into the hills, lying in the grass to hide. Between four and nine p.m., rioters set fire to the camp houses belonging to the coal company. By nine p.m., all but one Chinese camp house was burned completely. In all, 79 Chinese homes were destroyed by fire. Damage to Chinese-owned property was estimated at around $147,000.

Some Chinese died on the banks of Bitter Creek as they fled, others near the railroad bridge as they attempted to escape Chinatown. The rioters threw Chinese bodies into the flames of burning buildings. Other Chinese immigrants, who had hidden in their houses instead of fleeing, were murdered, and then their bodies were burned with their houses. Those who could not run, including the sick, were burned alive in their camp houses. Many of the Chinese who were burned in their houses apparently tried "to dig a hole in the cellar to hide themselves. But the fire overtook them when about half way in the hole, burning their lower limbs to a crisp and leaving the upper trunk untouched." One remaining Chinese immigrant was found dead in a laundry house in Whitemen's Town, his home demolished by rioters.

The attacks at Rock Springs were extraordinarily violent, revealing a long-held, almost "feral", hatred of the victims. The sheer brutality of the violence "startled" the entire country. Besides those who were burned alive, Chinese miners were scalped, mutilated, branded, decapitated, dismembered, and hanged from gutter spouts. One of the Chinese miners' penis and testicles were cut off and toasted in a nearby saloon as a "trophy of the hunt". The events amounted to racial terrorism.

There were 28 confirmed deaths, and at least 15 miners were wounded. But various sources assert that 40 to 50 fatalities might be a more accurate number, as some of those who fled were never accounted for. The Chinese consul in New York City compiled a detailed list of the massacre's victims.

Names of the dead

Bodies found mutilated
Leo Sun Tsung, 51: found in his hut with multiple wounds, including a bullet wound to the face
Leo Kow Boot, 24: found between mines three and four with a bullet wound to the neck
Yii See Yen, 36: found near Bitter Creek with a bullet wound to the temple
Leo Dye Bah, 56: found near the plank bridge with a bullet wound to the chest

Bodies found burned
Choo Bah Quot, 23: found in a hut adjoining Camp No. 34, partially burned
Sia Bun Ning, 37: head, neck and shoulders found in a hut near the Chinese temple, the rest of the body had been burned off
Leo Lung Hong, 45: upper torso found in a hut near Camp No. 27, the rest of the body was burned off
Leo Chih Ming, 49: head and chest found in a hut, the rest of the body was burned off
Liang Tsun Bong, 42: upper torso found in a hut, the rest of the body was burned off
Hsu Ah Cheong, 32: skull found in a hut, no other remains were available
Lor Han Lung, 32: sole and heel of left foot found in a hut near Camp No. 34
Hoo Ah Nii, 43: right half of head and backbone found in a hut
Leo Tse Wing, 39: lower half bones found in a hut near Camp No. 14

Bone fragments only or no bodies found
Leo Jew Foo, 35
Leo Tim Kwong, 31
Hung Qwan Chuen, 42
Tom He Yew, 34
Mar Tse Choy
Leo Lung Siang
Yip Ah Marn
Leo Lung Hon
Leo Lung Hor
Leo Ah Tsun
Leang Ding
Leo Hoy Yat
Yuen Chin Sing
Hsu Ah Tseng
Chun Quan Sing

Outcome

Immediate aftermath

In the days following the riot, surviving Chinese immigrants in Rock Springs fled and were picked up by Union Pacific trains. Once there, they were subjected to threats of murder and other crimes; Evanston was another area in Wyoming where anti-Chinese sentiment was high.

Rumors of the return of the Chinese to Rock Springs circulated immediately after the riots. On September 3, the Rock Springs Independent published an editorial which confirmed the rumors of "the return", as a few Chinese began to trickle back into town to search for valuables. The Independent said of the return of Chinese laborers to Rock Springs, "It means that Rock Springs is killed, as far as white men are concerned, if such program is carried out." The massacre was defended in the local newspaper, and, to an extent, in other western newspapers. In general, however, Wyoming newspapers disapproved of the acts of the massacre while supporting the cause of white miners.

Wyoming's territorial Governor Francis E. Warren visited Rock Springs on September 3, 1885, the day after the riot, to make a personal assessment. After his trip to Rock Springs, Warren traveled to Evanston, where he sent telegrams to U.S. President Grover Cleveland appealing for federal troops. Back in Rock Springs, the riot had calmed, but the situation was still unstable. Two companies of the United States Army's 7th Infantry arrived on September 5, 1885. One company, under the command of a Lieutenant Colonel Anderson, was stationed in Evanston, Wyoming; the other, under a Colonel Chipman, was stationed in Rock Springs. At Camp Murray, Utah Territory, Colonel Alexander McDowell McCook was ordered to augment the garrison sent to Wyoming with six more companies.

On September 9, 1885, one week after the massacre, six companies of soldiers arrived in Wyoming. Four of the six companies then escorted the Chinese back to Rock Springs. Once back in Rock Springs, the Chinese laborers found scorched tracts of land where their homes once stood. The mining company had buried only a few dead; others remained lying in the open, mangled, decomposing, and partially eaten by dogs, hogs, or other animals.

The situation in Rock Springs was stabilized as early as September 15, when Warren first requested the removal of federal troops, but the mines at Rock Springs remained closed for a time. On September 30, 1885, white miners, mostly Finnish immigrants who were members of the Knights of Labor, walked out of mines in Carbon County, Wyoming, in protest of the company's continued use of Chinese miners. In Rock Springs, the white miners were not back at work in late September, because the company still used Chinese labor. Rock Springs steadily became quieter, and, on October 5, 1885, emergency troops, except for two companies, were removed. However, the temporary posts of Camp Medicine Butte, established in Evanston, and of Camp Pilot Butte, in Rock Springs, remained long after the riot. Camp Pilot Butte closed in 1899 after the onset of the Spanish–American War.

The labor strike was unsuccessful, and the miners went back to work within a couple of months. The national Knights of Labor organization refused to support the Carbon strike and the hold out by white miners in Rock Springs following the Rock Springs Riot. The organization avoided supporting the miners along the Union Pacific Railroad, because it did not want to be seen as condoning the violence at Rock Springs. When the Union Pacific Coal Department reopened the mines, it fired 45 white miners connected to the violence.

Arrests
After the riot in Rock Springs, sixteen men were arrested, including Isaiah Washington, a member-elect to the territorial legislature. The men were taken to jail in Green River, where they were held until after a Sweetwater County grand jury refused to bring indictments. In explaining its decision, the grand jury declared that there was no cause for legal action, stating, in part: "We have diligently inquired into the occurrence at Rock Springs. ... [T]hough we have examined a large number of witnesses, no one has been able to testify to a single criminal act committed by any known white person that day."

Those arrested as suspects in the riot were released a little more than a month later, on October 7, 1885. On their release, they were "...met ... by several hundred men, women and children, and treated to a regular ovation", according to The New York Times. The defendants in the Rock Springs case enjoyed the same broad community consent that lynch mobs often received. No person or persons were ever convicted in the violence at Rock Springs.

Diplomatic and political issues

After the riot, the U.S. government hesitated to make amends to the Chinese for the massacre. In China, the governor-general of the Guangdong region suggested that Americans in China might be the target of revenge for the events in Rock Springs. The American envoy to China, Charles Harvey Denby, and others in the diplomatic corps reported rising anti-American sentiment in Hong Kong and in Canton, Guangdong, following the riot. American diplomats warned their government that the backlash from the massacre could ruin U.S. trade with China; they also reported that British merchants and newspapers in China were encouraging the Chinese to "stand up for their oppressed countrymen in America." Denby advised that U.S. Secretary of State Thomas Bayard obtain compensation for the victims of the massacre.

The United States government agreed to pay compensation for the damaged property but not for the actual victims of the massacre, although Bayard was inclined to resist the requests for payments. In a letter to the minister of China's Washington legation dated February 18, 1886, he expressed a personal view that the violence against Chinese immigrants was precipitated by their resistance to cultural assimilation, and that racism against Chinese was typically found among other immigrants rather than the majority of the populace: Denby's predictions caused Bayard to seek a Congressionally appropriated indemnity. At Bayard's urging, the U.S. Congress provided US$147,748.74 as an indemnity. The compensation was made as a monetary gift and not as a legal decree of responsibility for the massacre and the outcome amounted to a minor diplomatic victory for China.

Correspondence between Wyoming's territorial Governor, Francis Warren, and Union Pacific officials during Warren's term in office indicate that he petitioned the company for years to clear the titles on land he owned. He condemned the riot as "the most brutal and damnable outrage that ever occurred in any country."

Reaction
After the riot, rhetoric and reaction came from publications and key political figures concerning the events. The New York Times blasted the city of Rock Springs in the first of at least two editorials on the topic, stating, "the appropriate fate for a community of this kind would be that of Sodom and Gomorrah". In another Times editorial on November 10, 1885, the paper continued to assail not only the residents of Rock Springs who were involved in the violence, but those who stood by and let the mob continue its behavior. Newspapers in Wyoming, such as the Cheyenne Tribune and the Laramie Boomerang, reacted with sympathy toward the white miners. The Boomerang stated it "regretted" the riot but found extenuating circumstances surrounding the violence.

In addition to newspapers, anti-Chinese sentiment and stereotypes came from other publications. The Chautauquan: A Weekly Newsmagazine characterized the Chinese as weak and defenseless, stating in its coverage of the massacre: "To murder an industrious Chinaman is the same kind of fiendish work as the murder of women and children – it is equally a violation of the rights of the defenceless."

Knights of Labor leader Terence Powderly wrote in a letter to W.W. Stone (excerpts of which he included in a report to the U.S. Congress) that, "It is not necessary for me to speak of the numerous reasons given for the opposition to this particular race – their habits, religion, customs and practices ..." Powderly blamed the "problem" of Chinese immigration on the failings of the 1882 Exclusion Act. He faulted lax law enforcement, not those involved in the riots, for the attacks at Rock Springs. Powderly wrote that the U.S. Congress should stop "winking at violations of this statute" and reform the laws which barred Chinese immigration, which he believed could have prevented incidents such as "the recent assault upon the Chinese at Rock Springs".

In December 1885, U.S. President Grover Cleveland presented his State of the Union report to Congress, and in it, his reaction to the Rock Springs massacre. Cleveland's report pointed out that the United States was interested in good relations with China. He stated, "All of the power of this government should be exhorted to maintain the amplest good faith towards China in the treatment of these men, and the inflexible sternness of the law ... must be insisted upon ... race prejudice is the chief factor to originating these disturbances".

Post-massacre violence

The massacre at Rock Springs led to other incidents of anti-Chinese aggression, primarily in Washington Territory, though there were incidents in Oregon and other states as well. Near Newcastle, Washington a mob of whites burned down the barracks of 36 Chinese coal miners. Throughout the Puget Sound area, Chinese workers were driven out of communities and subject to violence in Washington cities and towns, including Tacoma, Seattle, Newcastle, and Issaquah. Chinese workers were driven out of other Washington towns, but sources indicated, as early as 1891, that the above events were specifically connected to the wave of violence touched off at Rock Springs.

The wave of anti-Chinese violence in the western United States following the Rock Springs Riot spread further, to the state of Oregon. Mobs drove Chinese workers out of small towns throughout the state in late 1885 and mid-1886. Other states reported incidents as well: As far away as Augusta, Georgia, anger was expressed against the Chinese in response to the massacre at Rock Springs. According to The New York Times, the rioting in Rock Springs fueled the desire of anti-Chinese Georgians in Augusta to air their grievances.

Significance and context
The Rock Springs massacre was seen by observers at the time, and by historians today, as one of the worst and most significant instance of anti-Chinese sentiment in the United States. The riot received widespread media coverage from publications such as The National Police Gazette and The New York Times. Among the events of anti-Chinese violence in the American west, the Rock Springs massacre is considered the most widely publicized.

Today, nearly all historians hold the view that the prime factor which contributed to the riot was race prejudice. However, a 1990 work on the Rock Springs massacre, written by journalist Craig Storti, marginalized the racial factor and put a stronger emphasis on the economic factors which contributed to violence. His book, Incident at Bitter Creek: The Rock Springs Massacre, was widely criticized in reviews, though Storti stated he represented the historical record as it stood. There were labor considerations that contributed to the violence in Rock Springs, though they are generally seen as less significant. The use of Chinese workers by the railroad during an 1875 strike created widespread resentment among the white miners, which continued to build until the Rock Springs massacre. Storti's book described anti-Chinese racism as "pervasive" even while downplaying its significance to the riot. The view that the Chinese refused to
assimilate into American culture was held historically and still carries some weight in present-day interpretations of the historical record.

Present-day Rock Springs has a population pushing 20,000. The former settlement is a full-fledged city. The area that once encompassed Camp Pilot Butte is located on the north bank of Bitter Creek, in the northwest part of the city. The camp covered  acres of Union Pacific property; the parade ground was in the center of a present-day city block bounded by Soulsby Street on the west, Pilot Butte Avenue on the east, Bridger Avenue on the north and Elias Avenue on its south. In 1973, the area where the army post once existed was listed on the U.S. National Register of Historic Places as a historic district. At that time, there were only two remaining original structures. The two buildings were owned by the Saints Cyril and Methodius Catholic Church in Rock Springs. The buildings are no longer extant, and the property is no longer listed on the National Register. The area that was once Chinatown, just north of where Camp Pilot Butte once stood, had a public elementary school built over part of it. In general, the locations in Rock Springs associated with the massacre have been surrounded and absorbed by the city's growth.

References

Notes

Sources

 Armentrout Ma, L. Eve. Incident at Bitter Creek: The Story of the Rock Springs Chinese Massacre – Craig Storti, (Book review via JSTOR), The Journal of Asian Studies, Vol. 50, No. 4, November 1991, pp. 922–23. Retrieved May 5, 2007.
 Bayard, Thomas F., Letter from Bayard to Cheng Tsao Ju, February 18, 1886, Microfilm M99, Notes to Foreign Legations in the United States from the Department of State, 1834–1906, China, National Archives Annex, College Park, Md.
 Camp Pilot Butte", National Register of Historic Places Nomination Form, Diocese of Cheyenne. Retrieved April 29, 2007.
 Chan, Loren B. Incident at Bitter Creek: The Story of the Rock Springs Chinese Massacre – Craig Storti", (Book review via JSTOR), The Journal of American History, Vol. 78, No. 4, March 1992, pp. 1463–64. Retrieved May 5, 2007.
 Chinese Exclusion Act, 1882, Text of Act, Mount Holyoke College. Retrieved March 12, 2007.
 Courtwright, David T. Violent Land: Single Men and the Social Disorder from the Frontier to the Inner City, (Google Books), Harvard University Press, 1998. Retrieved May 7, 2007.
 Daniels, Roger. Asian America: Chinese and Japanese in the United States Since 1850, (Google Books), University of Washington Press, 1990. Retrieved April 30, 2007.
 Daniels, Roger. "Incident at Bitter Creek: The Story of the Rock Springs Massacre – Craig Storti; Rock Springs Massacre", (Book review via JSTOR), The Pacific Historical Review, Vol. 61, No. 1, February 1992. Retrieved May 4, 2007.
 Hane, Mikiso. "Asian America: Chinese and Japanese in the United States Since 1850 – Roger Daniels", (Book review via JSTOR), The Western Historical Quarterly, Vol. 21, No. 2. May 1990, pp. 219–20. Retrieved May 8, 2007.
 Fontes, Justin and Fontes, Ron. Wyoming: Wyoming, the Equality State, (Google Books), Gareth Stevens, 2003. Retrieved May 8, 2007.
 Gardner, A. Dudley. Wyoming and the Chinese, "Wyoming History", Western Wyoming Community College. Retrieved March 12, 2007
 Grant, Frederic James. History of Seattle, Washington, (Google Books), American Publishing and Engraving Co., 1891. Retrieved April 29, 2007.
 Hardaway, Roger D. Incident at Bitter Creek: The Story of the Rock Springs Chinese Massacre – Craig Storti", (Book review via JSTOR), The Western Historical Quarterly, Vol. 23, No. 1, February 1992, pp. 102–3. Retrieved May 5, 2007.
 Healy, Patrick Joseph and Ng, Poon Chew."A Statement for Non-Exclusion", (Google Books), 1905, p. 238–39. Retrieved May 2, 2007.
 "History Matters: A U.S. Survey Course on the Web", To This We Dissented: The Rock Springs Riot, George Mason University. Retrieved March 12, 2007.
 History of Washington State & the Pacific Northwest, "Lesson Fifteen: Industrialization, Class, and Race: Chinese and the Anti-Chinese Movement in the Late 19th-Century Northwest", Center for Study of the Pacific Northwest, University of Washington. Retrieved March 12, 2007.
 Jackson, W. Turrentine. "The Governorship of Wyoming, 1885–1889: A Study in Territorial Politics", (JSTOR), The Pacific Historical Review, Vol. 13, No. 1, March 1944, pp. 1–11. Retrieved May 7, 2007.
 Larson, Taft Alfred. History of Wyoming, (Google Books), University of Nebraska Press, 1990. Retrieved April 30, 2007.
 Long, Priscilla. "Tacoma expels the entire Chinese community on November 3, 1885", The Online Encyclopedia of Washington State History, January 17, 2003. Retrieved March 12, 2007.
 Long, Priscilla. "White and Indian hop pickers attack Chinese", The Online Encyclopedia of Washington State History, published by: History Ink, July 1, 2000. Retrieved March 12, 2007.
 Max, "Not the Chinese, but the Land-Thieves", Liberty (Not the Daughter but the Mother of Order), March 17, 1883
 The New York Times. "Anti Chinese Sentiment", October 8, 1885, p. 1.
 The New York Times. "The Chinese In Augusta", (ProQuest), October 28, 1885, p. 2. Retrieved May 2, 2007.
 The New York Times. "The Chinese Must Leave", (ProQuest), September 29, 1885, p. 1. Retrieved May 2, 2007.
 The New York Times. "Labor Meeting at Buffalo—Opposition to the Introduction of Chinese", (ProQuest), November 3, 1870, p. 1. Retrieved May 2, 2007.
 The New York Times. "The Message to Congress", (ProQuest), (December 9, 1885, p. 4. Retrieved March 12, 2007.
 The New York Times. "Mob law in Wyoming", September 19, 1885, p. 4.
 The New York Times. "Protection of the Chinese", November 10, 1885, p. 4.
 The New York Times. "The Rock Springs Massacre",  September 26, 1885.
 Peters, Gerhard. "State of the Union Messages", The American Presidency Project, University of California, Santa Barbara. Retrieved March 12, 2007.
 Pletcher, David M. The Diplomacy of Involvement: American Economic Expansion Across the Pacific, 1784–1900, (Google Books), 2001, University of Missouri Press. Retrieved May 3, 2007.
 Rock Springs Independent, The return!, (Editorial), September 3, 1885, via George Mason University, "History Matters." Retrieved March 12, 2007.
 Saxton, Alexander. The Indispensable Enemy: Labor and the Anti-Chinese Movement in California, (Google Books), University of California Press, 1971,. Retrieved April 30, 2007.
 Saxton, Alexander and Roediger, David R. (Contributor). The Rise and Fall of the White Republic, (Google Books), Verso, 2003. Retrieved May 7, 2007.
 "Seward's 'Chinese Immigration'", Scribner's Monthly, April 1881, no. 6.
 Shewin, H. "Observations on the Chinese Laborer", Overland Monthly and Out West Magazine, January 1886, no. 37.
 Stone, W.W. "The Knights of Labor on the Chinese Labor Situation", Overland Monthly and Out West Magazine, March 1886, no.39.
 Storti, Craig and Daniels, Roger. "Communication – Letter from Storti" The Pacific Historical Review, Vol. 61, No. 4, November 1992, pp. 594–95. Retrieved May 4, 2007.
 Tucker, Henry St. George. "Limitations on the treaty-making power under the Constitution of the United States", (Google Books), Little, Brown, and Company, 1915. Retrieved May 3, 2007.
 Tucker, J.R., "Race Progress in the United States", The North American Review, February 1884, no. 327.
 U.S. Census Bureau. Historic Wyoming Census, (PDF), (1870–1990), "Wyoming Race and Hispanic Origin – 1870–1990", census.gov, Retrieved March 12, 2007.
 Waley-Cohen, Joanna. The Sextants of Beijing: Global Currents in Chinese History, (Google Books), W.W. Norton & Company, 1999. Retrieved April 30, 2007.
 Wu, Jean Yu-Wen Shen and Song, Min, eds. Asian American Studies, (Google Books), Rutgers University Press, New Jersey: 2000, pp. 51–52, 64, 367..

Further reading

The Chinese Massacre at Rock Springs, Wyoming Territory, September 2, 1885, Boston: Franklin Press – Rand Avery and Co., 1886.
Carroll, Murray L. "Governor Francis E. Warren, The United States Army and the Chinese Massacre at Rock Springs", Annals of Wyoming, 1987, Vol. 59 No. 2, pp. 16–27,.
Crane, Paul and Larson Alfred. "The Chinese Massacre", Annals of Wyoming, XII:1, January 1940, pp. 47–55. Reprinted in Daniels Rogers, ed., Anti-Chinese Violence in North America, op. cit.; and Storti, Craig, Incident at Bitter Creek: The Story of the Rock Springs Chinese Massacre.
Daniels, Roger, ed. Anti-Chinese Violence in North America: An Original Anthology, Arno Press, New York: 1979..
Hata, Nadine I. Asian America: Chinese and Japanese in the United States since 1850. Roger Daniels", Book review, The Journal of American History, Vol. 77, No. 1, June 1990, pp. 304–5. 
 Ichioka, Yuji. "Asian Immigrant Coal Miners and the United Mine Workers of America: Race and Class at Rock Springs, Wyoming, 1907." Amerasia Journal 6#2 (1979): 1–23.
Laurie, Clayton D. "Civil Disorder and the Military in Rock Springs, Wyoming: The Army's Role in the 1885 Chinese Massacre", Montana, 1990, Vol. 40 No. 3, pp. 44–59.
McClellan, Robert F. "The Indispensable Enemy. Alexander Saxton", (Book review) via (JSTOR), The Journal of Asian Studies, Vol. 31, No. 1, November 1971, p. 176. Retrieved May 2, 2007.
Storti, Craig. Incident at Bitter Creek: The Story of the Rock Springs Chinese Massacre, Iowa State Press, First edition: 1990,,.
Wei, William, Hom, Marlon K, et al., eds. "The Anti-Chinese Movement in Colorado: Interethnic Competition and Conflict on the Eve of Exclusion", Chinese America: History and Perspectives, 1995, San Francisco: Chinese Historical Society of America, 1995, pp. 179–97..
Yep, Laurence. True Heroes, (EbscoHost), Academic Search Premier, Horn Book Magazine, November/December 2002, Vol. 78, Issue 6,. Retrieved April 30, 2007.

External links

Chinese accounts of killings at Rock Springs (1885), (PDF): University of Colorado  ["Page not found"]
Official  Rock Springs, Wyoming website

1885 in Wyoming Territory
1885 murders in the United States
White American riots in the United States
Anti-Chinese violence in the United States
Asian-American riots in the United States
Labor disputes in the United States
1885 labor disputes and strikes
1885 riots
Massacres in 1885
Murder in Wyoming
Massacres in the United States
Massacres of ethnic groups
Chinese-American history
Mass shootings in Wyoming
Mining in Wyoming
Sweetwater County, Wyoming
Massacre
Wyoming Territory
Labor-related riots in the United States
Riots and civil disorder in Wyoming
American frontier
Labor disputes in Wyoming
September 1885 events
Hate crimes